Sosa station is a station on the Seoul Subway Line 1 & Seohae Line in South Korea.

Sosa station may also refer to:
Sōsa Station, a station on the Miki line in Kakogawa, Japan
Sŏsi or Sosa Station (North Korea), a station on the Chongnam and Sohae lines